Agnidra fenestra is a moth in the family Drepanidae. It was described by John Henry Leech in 1898. It is found in north-eastern Myanmar and the Chinese provinces of Sichuan, Yunnan and Shaanxi.

References

Moths described in 1898
Drepaninae
Moths of Asia